Wollmar Filip Boström (15 June 1878 – 7 November 1956) was a Swedish diplomat and tennis player. He competed at the 1908 and 1912 Olympics in singles and men's doubles and won a bronze medal in the doubles in 1908, finishing fifth in three other events.

He was son to Governor of Södermanland County Filip Boström and nephew to Prime Minister Erik Gustaf Boström. In 1903 he started working at the Swedish Ministry of Foreign Affairs. In 1909–13 he served as president of the Swedish Tennis Association, and in 1918–22 was a cabinet secretary. From 1925 till 1945 he was the Swedish minister in Washington.

References

1878 births
1956 deaths
Swedish male tennis players
Olympic tennis players of Sweden
Olympic bronze medalists for Sweden
Tennis players at the 1908 Summer Olympics
Tennis players at the 1912 Summer Olympics
Olympic medalists in tennis
Ambassadors of Sweden to the United States
Ambassadors of Sweden to Spain
Ambassadors of Sweden to Portugal
Medalists at the 1908 Summer Olympics